The 1949 Texas Western Miners football team was an American football team that represented Texas Western College (now known as University of Texas at El Paso) as a member of the Border Conference during the 1949 college football season. In its fourth season under head coach Jack Curtice, the team compiled an 8–2–1 record (4–2 against Border Conference opponents), finished third in the conference, defeated Georgetown in the 1950 Sun Bowl, and outscored all opponents by a total of 292 to 113.

Schedule

References

Texas Western
UTEP Miners football seasons
Sun Bowl champion seasons
Texas Western Miners football